"Set the World on Fire" is a 1994 song recorded by the Swedish musician known as E-Type. It features vocals by singer Nana Hedin and was released as the first single from his debut album, Made in Sweden. The song was a hit in several countries, particularly in Sweden where it reached number 2. It was released twice, first in 1994, then in 1995, and also featured twice on the album Made in Sweden: in the original studio version, and in an acoustic version. In 1996, it was released in the United States and peaked at #22 on the Billboard Hot Dance Club Play; it remained charted for a total of 11 weeks.

Critical reception
Robbert Tilli from Music & Media described "Set the World on Fire" as "vintage Euro dance, with a slightly harder edge to it."

Music video
Two different music videos were made for the song. Both feature Nana Hedin.

Track listings

 CD maxi 1
 "Set The World on Fire (7" version) — 3:43
 "Set The World on Fire (amadin boeing remix) — 7:47
 "Set The World on Fire (extended version) — 8:03
 "Set The World on Fire (E-Type's tyroler mix) — 3:47

 CD maxi 2
 "Set the World on Fire" (single version) — 3:28
 "Set the World on Fire" (extended pop) — 6:12
 "Set the World on Fire" (yetin and max mix) — 5:37
 "Set the World on Fire" (amadin boeing remix) — 7:47

Charts and certifications

Weekly charts

Year-end charts

Certifications

References

1994 singles
1994 songs
E-Type (musician) songs
Nana Hedin songs
Song recordings produced by Denniz Pop
Stockholm Records singles
English-language Swedish songs